The women's 1500 metres event at the 2021 European Athletics Indoor Championships was held on 5 March 2021 at 12:22 (heats), and on 6 March at 19:50 (final) local time. The event was won by Belgium's Elise Vanderelst in a time of 4:18.44 minutes.

In the final Spain's Águeda Marqués and Great Britain's Holly Archer were initially disqualified for jostling. Archer had her disqualification overturned on appeal and won the silver medal.

Medalists

Records

Results

Heats

Qualification: First 2 in each heat (Q) and the next 3 fastest (q) advance to the Final.

Final

References

2021 European Athletics Indoor Championships
1500 metres at the European Athletics Indoor Championships
European